Gary Dale Timberlake (born August 9, 1948) is an American former professional baseball pitcher. He appeared in two games for the 1969 Seattle Pilots of Major League Baseball (MLB).

Biography
Timberlake was drafted by the New York Yankees in the second round (30th overall) of the 1966 MLB draft. His minor league baseball career spanned 1966 to 1975; he appeared in 177 games (103 starts) with a 45–40 win-loss record, four saves and a 4.08 ERA.

In October 1968, Timberlake was selected by the Seattle Pilots from the Yankees as the 48th pick in the 1968 MLB expansion draft. His major league career lasted about one week, as he was the starting pitcher in two games, on June 18 and 24, 1969, for the Pilots against the Chicago White Sox. Days later, he was called to military service; aged 20, he was summoned to serve six months of active duty with his Army Reserve unit. In his brief MLB career, Timberlake allowed 16 baserunners (via seven hits and nine walks) and five earned runs in six total innings pitched. He recorded a 0–0 record with four strikeouts and a 7.50 earned run average (ERA). 

Timberlake was born in Laconia, Indiana. He attended Western Kentucky University, and after leaving baseball worked for a chemical company. As of 2006, he resided in Louisville, Kentucky.

References

External links
 , or SeattlePilots.com

1948 births
Living people
Major League Baseball pitchers
Baseball players from Indiana
People from Harrison County, Indiana
Seattle Pilots players
Johnson City Yankees players
Tucson Toros players
Iowa Oaks players
Portland Beavers players
Vancouver Mounties players
Clinton Pilots players
Jacksonville Suns players
Oneonta Yankees players
Fort Lauderdale Yankees players
Western Kentucky University alumni